Wayne Kyle Spitzer (born July 15, 1966) is an American author and low-budget horror filmmaker from Spokane, Washington. He is the writer/director of the short horror film Shadows in the Garden, as well as the author of Flashback, a horror novel published in 1993. Spitzer's non-genre writing has appeared in subTerrain Magazine: "Strong Words for a Polite Nation" and Columbia: The Magazine of Northwest History.

Spitzer was highly active in Spokane's underground filmmaking scene from 1994 to 2005. His notable projects include Dead of Night, a Spokane-area (cable TV) broadcast venture, Don't Look Up, and a feature-length compilation, Monstersdotcom, including Shadows in the Garden and Last Stop Station.
  
Spitzer has taught creative writing at Corbin Art Center and Airway Heights Corrections Center. He holds a Master of Fine Arts degree in Writing from Eastern Washington University, a Bachelor of English from Gonzaga University, and an Associate in Applied Science degree in Television Production from Spokane Falls Community College.

Spitzer's recent work includes The Ferryman Pentalogy, comprising Comes a Ferryman, The Tempter and the Taker, The Pierced Veil, Black Hole, White Fountain, To the End of Ursathrax, and The X-Ray Rider Trilogy, along with Algernon Blackwood's The Willows: A Scriptment.

References

External links

 https://www.inlander.com/spokane/dark-shadows/Content?oid=2175111
 
 Goodreads entry1
 Spitzerkumpon Channel on YouTube
 Spitzerkumpon YouTube Profile
 Indieflix.com
 Curriculum Vitae
 Teaching 
 Teaching 
 Phantom of the Movies' Videoscope Magazine

Further reading
 Interview: Adapting 'The Willows'
 Dead men stalk airwaves, Spokesman-Review Article, The Region, front of page
 Dead men stalk airwaves, Spokesman-Review Article, The Region, article continued

Living people
1966 births
Writers from Spokane, Washington
American filmmakers
American male writers
Artists from Spokane, Washington